Ivan Milutinović (nickname Milutin; ; 27 September 1901 – 23 October 1944) was a Yugoslav Partisan general and an eminent military commander who participated in World War II.

Before the war 
In October 1940, during the Fifth Land Conference of the Communist Party of Yugoslavia held in Zagreb, Milutinović was elected as a member of Politburo. At this conference Tito formulated the leftist strategy of the CPY as focused on a revolutionary seizure of power in the country in order to organize a Soviet-style administrative organization in Yugoslavia.  Besides Milovan Đilas and Boris Kidrič, Milutinović would become one of the major proponents of the policy of leftist errors pursued during the Second World War.

Second World War 
On 27 June 1941 Milutinović was elected as a member of the Supreme Staff of the National Liberation Partisan Units of Yugoslavia. During the Uprising in Montenegro, Chetnik commander Bajo Stanišić wanted to negotiate with the Partisans but Ivan Milutinović, as a commander of the Partisan forces in Montenegro, refused to reply to Stanišić's proposal. Milutinović had numerous exhausting polemics with Terence Atherton in futile attempts to convince him to change his positive view about Chetnik leader Draža Mihailović.

Death 
Ivan Milutinović died on 23 October 1944 when a small boat which was transporting him to Belgrade hit a naval mine in the Danube. He was decorated with the Order of the People's Hero.

The remains of Ivan Milutinović were buried in the Tomb of People's Heroes in Belgrade, Republic of Serbia.

Legacy 
From 1949 until 1992 Berane was named as Ivangrad in honour of Milutinović. Until 2006 the Square of the Republic in Podgorica was known as Ivan Milutinović Square. The leading company for waterways in former Yugoslavia and today in Serbia is PIM Ivan Milutinović. Many schools in SFRY carried Milutinović's name. Some schools in Serbia and Montenegro still do.

References

Sources

External links 
 Pavle Ljumović:  IVAN MILUTINOVIĆ MILUTIN, ČOVJEK I RATNIK

1901 births
1944 deaths
Yugoslav Partisans members
Generals of the Yugoslav People's Army
Recipients of the Order of the People's Hero
Montenegrin communists
Montenegrin generals
Yugoslav military personnel killed in World War II